These are vessels named for presidents of the United States of America (in order of their presidency and ship's commissioning):

Ships named for one president
 George Washington has had several vessels named after him before he died in 1799, including at least four in the 1770s and one in 1798, one in 1814 as well as an armored cruiser, a submarine and an aircraft carrier in the 20th century. (See also ). 
 USS Washington (1775) was a schooner named Endeavor acquired by Gen. Washington in October 1775, renamed Washington, and re-rigged as a brigantine. 
 USS Washington (1776) was a row galley that operated in Narragansett Bay during the winter and spring of 1776. 
 USS Washington (1776) was one of 13 frigates authorized by the Continental Congress. She was launched in August 1776. Destroyed prior to commissioning.
 USS Washington (1776), a lateen-rigged two-masted galley, was built in the autumn of 1776.
 USS George Washington (1798) was a 24-gun sloop-of-war commissioned in 1798.
  (1814) a ship of the line, was the second such to be launched by the Navy, and was on active service from 1815 to 1820.
 USS George Washington (SSBN-598), in commission 1959–1985.
 George Washington-class ballistic missile submarine, lead ship
  was commissioned in 1992.
 Nimitz-class supercarrier
 John Adams has had two ships named after him in 1799 before his death on 4 July 1826, as well as a submarine in the 20th century:
 USS Adams (1799) was a 28-gun frigate built in New York, and launched 8 June 1799;
 USS John Adams (1799) was a 24-gun frigate built in Charleston, South Carolina launched 1 October 1799.
 USS John Adams (SSBN-620), in commission 1964–1989.
 Lafayette-class ballistic missile submarine
 Thomas Jefferson has had one ship named in his honor before his death, as well as a submarine in the 20th century:
 USS Jefferson (1814) was launched in 1814;
 USS Thomas Jefferson in service 1942–1955.
 
 , in commission 1963–1986.
 Ethan Allen-class nuclear-powered ballistic missile submarine
 NOAAS Thomas Jefferson (S 222) was commissioned 2003
 James Madison has had three vessels named for him before he died on 28 June 1836, as well as a submarine in the 20th century:
 USS James Madison (1807) was commissioned in 1807. 
 USS Madison (1812) was a 14-gun schooner launched in 1812.
 USS Madison (1832) was a Van Buren-class schooner, designed by Edward Preble and built in 1832.
 USS James Madison (SSBN-627), in commission 1963–1992.
 Ballistic missile submarine, lead ship
 James Monroe has the following vessels named for him;:
 USS President Monroe in service 1943–1946.
 
 USS James Monroe (SSBN-622), in commission 1963–1990.
Lafayette-class ballistic missile submarine
 Andrew Jackson has had three vessels named for him:
 The United States revenue cutter Jackson, commissioned in 1832.
 USS President Jackson in service 1941–1955.
 
USS Andrew Jackson (SSBN-619), in commission in 1963–1989.
 Lafayette-class ballistic missile submarine
 Martin Van Buren has had one vessel named in his honor before his death, as well as an indirectly named patrol frigate in the 20th century:
 USS Van Buren (1839), commissioned in 1839 (See also ).
 Schooner
 USS Van Buren (PF-42), a Tacoma-class patrol frigate in commission from 1943 to 1946 was actually named for the city of Van Buren, Arkansas though the city was named for Martin Van Buren.
 James K. Polk has had two vessels named for him:
 USS President Polk, in service 1943–1946.
 President Jackson-class transport
 USS James K. Polk (SSBN-645), in commission in 1965–1999.
 Benjamin Franklin-class ballistic missile submarine
 James Buchanan has the following vessels named for him;
 USS Republic (AP-33) was briefly named USS President Buchanan; see also USS President Grant below.
 Abraham Lincoln has three
 USS President Lincoln, commissioned 1917, sunk 1918.
 USS Abraham Lincoln (SSBN-602), in commission 1961–1981.
 George Washington-class ballistic missile submarine
 USS Abraham Lincoln (CVN-72), commissioned in 1989.
 Nimitz-class supercarrier
 Ulysses S. Grant has the following vessels named for him;
 USS General Grant, a steamship gunboat commissioned from 1864 to 1865
 USS President Grant (ID-3014), later USS Republic (AP-33), in commission 1917–1919, 1921, and 1941–1945.
 USS U. S. Grant (AP-29), in commission 1917-1919 and 1941–1945.
 USS Ulysses S. Grant (SSBN-631), in commission 1964–1992.
 James Madison-class ballistic missile submarine
 Rutherford B. Hayes has the following vessels named for him;
 USS President Hayes, in service 1941–1949.
 President Jackson-class attack transport
 Theodore Roosevelt has had three vessels named in his honor, including:
 , troop transport in commission 1918–1919.
 USS Theodore Roosevelt (SSBN-600), in commission 1961–1982.
 USS George Washington class ballistic missile submarine
 USS Theodore Roosevelt (CVN-71), was commissioned in 1986.
 Nimitz-class supercarrier
 Woodrow Wilson has the following vessels named for him;
 USS Woodrow Wilson (SSBN-624), in commission 1963–1994.
Lafayette-class ballistic missile submarine
 Franklin D. Roosevelt has the following vessels named for him;
 USS Franklin D. Roosevelt (CV-42), in commission 1945–1977.
 Midway-class aircraft carrier
 USS Roosevelt (DDG-80), commissioned in 2000.
 
 Harry S. Truman has the following vessels named for him;
 USS Harry S. Truman (CVN-75), initially USS United States, was commissioned in 1998.
Nimitz-class supercarrier
 Dwight D. Eisenhower has the following vessels named for him;
 USS Dwight D. Eisenhower (CVN-69), was commissioned in 1977.
 Nimitz-class supercarrier
 John F. Kennedy has the following vessels named for him;
USS John F. Kennedy (CV-67), in commission 1968–2007, Docked at NISMF, Philadelphia, Pennsylvania
  supercarrier, lead ship
 USS John F. Kennedy (CVN-79), began construction in 2011 and is to be placed in commission in 2020.
 Lyndon B. Johnson has the following vessels named for him;
 , began construction in April 2012 and to be placed in service in 2018.

 Gerald R. Ford has the following vessels named for him;
 USS Gerald R. Ford (CVN-78), commissioned in 2017.
 Gerald R. Ford-class supercarrier, lead ship

 Jimmy Carter has the following vessels named for him;
 USS Jimmy Carter (SSN-23) was named in 2004; Jimmy Carter is the only living president with a submarine named for him
 
 Ronald Reagan has the following vessels named for him;
 USS Ronald Reagan (CVN-76), commissioned in 2003. 
Nimitz-class supercarrier
 George H. W. Bush has the following vessels named for him;
, commissioned in 2009.

Ship named for two presidents
John Adams and John Quincy Adams:
 in service 1941–1943.

Ships named for the Office of the President
USS President, of which there have been two
USS President (1800) was a wooden-hulled, three-masted heavy frigate and was one of the original six frigates of the United States Navy. Captured by the Royal Navy in 1815.
USS President (1812) was a 12-gun sloop-of-war that served until 1814 when also captured by the Royal Navy.
During a short period both USS Presidents were simultaneously in US Navy service under the same name.

Presidents with no US Navy vessel named after them
 William Henry Harrison
 John Tyler
 Zachary Taylor
 Millard Fillmore
 Several non-military vessels have been named SS President Fillmore, one was later commissioned as USS Powhatan
 Franklin Pierce
 See also: SS President Pierce, later USS Hugh L. Scott (AP-43)
 Andrew Johnson
 See also: SS President Johnson, commissioned as USS Manchuria (ID-1633) from 1918 to 1919.
 James A. Garfield
 See also: , later commissioned as USS Refuge (AH-11) from 1944 to 1948
 See also: , later commissioned as USS Thomas Jefferson (APA-30) (see above)
 Chester A. Arthur
 See also: SS President Arthur, later commissioned as USS Princess Matoika (ID-2290) (1918-1919)
 Grover Cleveland
 Benjamin Harrison
 William McKinley
 See also: SS President McKinley, later commissioned as USS J. Franklin Bell (APA-16)
 William Howard Taft
 Warren G. Harding
 Calvin Coolidge
 Herbert Hoover
 Richard Nixon
 Bill Clinton
 George W. Bush
 Barack Obama
 Donald Trump
 Joe Biden

See also
 List of United States Navy ships
 List of current ships of the United States Navy
 List of U.S. Navy losses in World War II
 List of U.S. military vessels named after women
 List of aircraft carriers of the United States Navy
 List of submarines of the United States Navy
 List of patrol vessels of the United States Navy
 List of presidents of the United States
 Presidential memorials in the United States

Notes

References

Presidents
 Military vessels
U.S. military vessels named after presidents